Reece Thomas Fielding (born 23 September 1998) is an English professional footballer who plays as a defender for  Sheffield FC.

Playing career
Fielding came through the Doncaster Rovers youth team to sign a two-year scholarship contract in May 2015. He then went on to sign an 18-month professional contract after regular training with the first team squad in 2016. He made his first-team debut at 17 years of age in a 2–0 win over Mansfield Town in an EFL Trophy group stage game at Field Mill on 30 August 2016. He then went on to make 2 more appearances for Darren Fergusons squad in the same trophy against Derby County and Sunderland while featuring in many match day squads in the league campaign.

Statistics

References

1998 births
Living people
Footballers from Doncaster
English footballers
Association football defenders
Doncaster Rovers F.C. players
Biggleswade Town F.C. players
English Football League players